Glen George Read was born on 4 September 1981 in Cuckfield, West Sussex and played cricket in his formative years for Sussex 2nd XI before going to Durham University and making his first-class debut for the University side. Read also represented the British Universities. Read is a tall left arm medium-fast swing bowler. He has had strong performances against the counties and Bangladesh, with the prize scalp of Mohammad Ashraful. Read also played against the Sri Lankan A touring side in 2004 picking up three wickets. Read also played in the North East Premier League for Philadelphia and Chester-le-Street Cricket Clubs, and in the Middlesex League for Southgate CC. He now works for the MCC.

External links 
 Cricinfo player page for Glen Read
 Read vs Bangladesh

English cricketers
People from Cuckfield
Living people
Durham MCCU cricketers
Hampshire Cricket Board cricketers
Sussex Cricket Board cricketers
British Universities cricketers
Year of birth missing (living people)
Alumni of Collingwood College, Durham